Dispersal may refer to:

 Biological dispersal, the movement of organisms from their birth site to their breeding site, or from one breeding site to another
 Dispersal vector, forces that carry seeds for plants
 Oceanic dispersal, the movement of terrestrial organisms from one land mass to another by sea-crossing
 Seed dispersal, the movement or transport of seeds away from the parent plant
 Dispersal draft, a system in professional sports for reassigning players whose former team is defunct
 Dispersal of ownership, breaking up large media companies and media conglomerates to diversify ownership of property rights
 Force dispersal, strategic spreading-out of military personnel and vehicles to reduce collateral damage
 Dispersal prison, one of five secure prisons in the United Kingdom that houses Category A prisoners
 Dispersal index, for volcanic eruptions
 The dispersal area of an aerodrome, where aeroplanes are parked away from the runway.

See also
Dispersion (disambiguation)
Dispersive (disambiguation)
Dispersity, a measure of the heterogeneity of sizes of molecules or particles in a mixture